Polar is a research refrigerator designed and developed by University of Alabama at Birmingham (UAB) Center for Biophysical Sciences and Engineering (CBSE) for NASA Cold Stowage. Polar was designed as a single mid-deck locker equivalent payload to store scientific samples on-board ISS and in transport to/from ISS via SpaceX Dragon or Cygnus spacecraft.

Description 
 Polar is mounted in the ISS on the EXpedite the PRocessing of Experiments to Space Station (EXPRESS) rack.
 Polar is air-cooled via rear-air fan.

Additional Cold Stowage 
Polar is one of multiple units available for storage on the ISS and/or transportation to and from the ISS. Others include:
 Minus Eighty Degree Laboratory Freezer for ISS (MELFI)
 
 MERLIN (Microgravity Experiment Research Locker/ Incubator)
 
 GLACIER (General Laboratory Active Cryogenic ISS Experiment Refrigerator)

See also 
 Scientific research on the ISS
 International Space Station
 SpaceX Dragon

References 

University of Alabama at Birmingham
Cooling technology
Space technology